Cristobal Huet (born September 3, 1975) is a French-Swiss former professional ice hockey goaltender who is currently a goalie coach for Lausanne HC of the National League (NL). He previously played for HC Lugano and HC Fribourg-Gottéron and within the Chicago Blackhawks, Los Angeles Kings, Montreal Canadiens, and Washington Capitals organizations in the National Hockey League (NHL). He is the first French netminder and second French-trained player overall (after Philippe Bozon) to play in the NHL.

Huet won the Stanley Cup with the Chicago Blackhawks during the 2009–10 NHL season, and became the first Frenchman to win the Stanley Cup as a player. He will be inducted into the IIHF Hall of Fame in 2023. He currently co-hosts hockey TV show, Le Repas d'équipe, with fellow French-born Swiss former player Laurent Meunier on MySports.

Playing career

Amateur
As a youth, Huet played in the 1988 Quebec International Pee-Wee Hockey Tournament with a team from Grenoble.

HC Lugano
Huet played for HC Lugano from the 1998–99 season to 2001–02. His career took a significant turn in these years. He won the National League A Championship in his first year, and reached the European Hockey League final four the next year.

Los Angeles Kings
Huet was drafted by the Los Angeles Kings as their seventh-round pick, 214th overall, in the 2001 NHL Entry Draft. He played for the Kings in the 2002–2003 and 2003–2004 seasons. He was traded to the Montreal Canadiens in a three-team deal that sent Mathieu Garon to Los Angeles and Radek Bonk from Ottawa to Montreal. During the 2004–05 lockout Huet played for the Adler Mannheim in the Deutsche Eishockey Liga. He led the team to the finals, where the Eagles lost in three straight games to Eisbären Berlin.

Montreal Canadiens
During the 2005–06 season, Huet eventually won the starting job in goal for the Canadiens at the expense of José Théodore, who was subsequently traded to Colorado in exchange for goaltender David Aebischer. He also won the Molson Cup in February 2006. He won the Best Defensive Player award from the NHL during the first week of March, ousting goaltenders such as the Ottawa Senators' Ray Emery and the New Jersey Devils' Martin Brodeur, with a 3–0–0 record and a 1.67 GAA. For the second time of the year, he was named NHL Best Defensive Player on April 3 with a 3–0–0 record, a 0.65 GAA and 0.979 SV%, ousting goaltenders Martin Brodeur, Flames goalie Miikka Kiprusoff and Detroit's Manny Legace.

On April 23, in his first NHL playoff start, Huet starred in a 6–1 win against the 2nd seeded and eventual Stanley Cup champion Carolina Hurricanes. Huet stopped 42 of 43 shots in the contest to put the Canadiens up 1–0 in the seven-game series.  Two days later, Huet recorded his first overtime playoff win, when the Canadiens beat the Hurricanes 6–5 in double overtime to take the lead 2–0 in the series. However, Huet and the Canadiens lost the next four games and the series in goaltender duels with rookie Cam Ward, who had taken Martin Gerber's starting spot in the series, and who would later go on to win the Conn Smythe Trophy.

The Canadiens re-signed Huet in the 2006 off-season to a two-year deal at $5.75 million total, earning $3 million the first season and $2.75 million in the second year.

On January 13, 2007, Huet was announced as one of the three goalies of the Eastern Conference All-Star Team in the 55th NHL All-Star Game in Dallas. A month later, however, he suffered a left hamstring injury that caused him to miss most of the final two months of the season. In his absence, the Canadiens struggled, and the team missed the postseason.

Washington Capitals
On February 26, 2008 Montreal Canadiens general manager Bob Gainey traded the French netminder to the Washington Capitals for a 2009 second-round draft pick. The Canadiens decided to trade Huet because of highly touted prospect, Carey Price. In Washington, he took over the starting position from Olaf Kölzig, pushing incumbent backup Brent Johnson to the pressbox, and his exceptional play helped lead Washington to secure a playoff berth, where they lost the opening round series against the Philadelphia Flyers in seven games.

Chicago Blackhawks
On July 1, 2008, the first day of unrestricted free-agency, Huet agreed to terms on a new 4-year contract with the Chicago Blackhawks worth a total of $22.4 million or $5.625 million per season.

Following the signing, Blackhawks general manager Dale Tallon announced the team would enter the season with a tandem of Huet and Nikolai Khabibulin. Unable to win the starting job over Khabibulin to start the season, Huet found himself on the bench more often than not. Gradually, he earned back his playing time and both alternated every game for almost 3 months until Khabibulin went down with a groin injury in early February. The tandem, however, earned praise around the NHL. A second Khabibulin injury in early February thrust Huet in the spotlight once again, and he was named the NHL's 3rd star of the week for Feb 15–21, posting a 3–0–0 record and allowing just five goals on 72 shots. In the end however, Khabibulin was named the playoff starter for the Blackhawks, and they defeated the Calgary Flames in the first round as well as the Vancouver Canucks in the second round.

Huet made his next appearance for the Blackhawks during game three of the 2009 Western Conference Finals, where he was called to replace an injured Khabibulin. He made six saves, and allowed the Blackhawks to collect an overtime win. With Khabibulin still recovering from a lower body injury, Joel Quenneville named Huet the team's starting goalie for the fourth game against Detroit. Huet allowed five goals on 21 shots, and was temporarily replaced by Corey Crawford. During the final game of the series, Huet stopped 44 shots en route to a 2–1 overtime loss.

For the first time in his career, Huet started a season as the undisputed number one goaltender, but as the 2009–10 campaign wore on, Antti Niemi eventually replaced Huet as Chicago's starter going into the playoffs. Huet played only twenty minutes in the 2010 Stanley Cup Playoffs, which the Blackhawks won with Niemi in net and with an overall playoff record of 16–6. With the Hawks victory, Huet became the first native of France to get his name engraved on the Stanley Cup.

On September 27, 2010, Chicago loaned Huet to HC Fribourg-Gotteron of the Swiss National League A in order to stay within the salary cap.

Fribourg-Gotteron
In his first year with Fribourg-Gotteron, Huet played in 41 games but struggled in the second half of the season, accumulating a 2.84 goals against average as the team finished 8th. Fribourg qualified for the playoffs only to be swept by HC Davos. The following season he improved to a goals against average of 1.99 in 39 games, third best in the league that year. The team defeated HC Lugano in the quarterfinals in 6 games but lost to SC Bern in the semifinals in 5 games. Huet's loan and his contract with the Blackhawks expired when the playoffs ended, thus making him a free agent.

Lausanne HC

Failing to sign with an NHL team, he returned to the National League and signed a 4-year deal with Lausanne HC of the National League B. His first season in Lausanne was a success, as the team won the National League B title and went on to win promotion to the National League by defeating SC Langnau in the qualification round.

Retirement from the French national team
In May 2017, Huet played at the 2017 IIHF World Championship, in Paris, representing France. He played his last game at the final round robin game of France, against Slovenia, with a win, and ended with a standing ovation, retiring with France's Team Captain Laurent Meunier. Team France (Les Bleus) did not advance to the medal round, but was not relegated.

Career statistics

Regular season and playoffs

International

Honours
French Elite League Champion with the Brûleurs de loups of Grenoble, 1997/98
Albert Hassler Trophy (Most Valuable Domestic Player in the French Elite League), 1997/98
Jean Ferrand Trophy (Most Valuable Goaltender in the French Elite League), 1996/97 and 1997/98
Swiss National A League Champion with HC Lugano, 1998/99
European Hockey League Final Four with HC Lugano, 1999/00
Jacques Plante Trophy (Best GAA in the Swiss National A League), 1999/00 and 2000/01
Roger Crozier Saving Grace Award (Best Save% in the NHL – National Hockey League), 2005/06
Nominee for Bill Masterton Trophy (Awarded to the player who best exemplifies the qualities of perseverance, sportsmanship, and dedication to ice hockey.), 2005/2006
NHL Defensive Player of the Week 3–5–06
NHL All Star Team roster – 2007
Nominee for NHL All Star team – 2008
NHL 3rd star for January 2008
NHL 3rd star of the week (Feb 15–21 2009)
NHL 1st star of the week (Dec 14–21 2009)
NHL 2010 Stanley Cup Champion (Season 2009–2010)
Inducted into the IIHF Hall of Fame in 2023

References

External links
 
 Cristobal Huet biography, including game-by-game results, at The Goaltender Home Page
 Cristobal Huet at Yahoo! Sports
 Cristobal Huet receives Roger Crozier award

1975 births
Living people
Adler Mannheim players
Brûleurs de Loups players
Chicago Blackhawks players
French ice hockey goaltenders
Hamilton Bulldogs (AHL) players
HC Fribourg-Gottéron players
HC Lugano players
Ice hockey players at the 1998 Winter Olympics
Ice hockey players at the 2002 Winter Olympics
Lausanne HC players
Los Angeles Kings draft picks
Los Angeles Kings players
Manchester Monarchs (AHL) players
Montreal Canadiens players
National Hockey League All-Stars
Olympic ice hockey players of France
People from Saint-Martin-d'Hères
Stanley Cup champions
Washington Capitals players
Sportspeople from Isère